Ken Parsons (born 1953) was born and spent his early life in the North East of England. His early academic promise was evident in his primary school and he gained a place at grammar school where in 1971 he achieved grades for a place at Loughborough University from where he graduated with a degree in Ergonomics in 1974.  After a year at Hughes Hall, Cambridge University in 1980 he was awarded a PhD from the Institute of Sound and Vibration Research at Southampton University  He returned to Loughborough University and founded the Human Thermal Environments Laboratory in 1981.  He went on to gain international renown in the field of Human Thermal Environments and to be an authority in the field. He has published a number of definitive texts.

Biography
Ken Parsons is emeritus professor of environmental ergonomics at Loughborough University. He graduated in Ergonomics from Loughborough University in 1974 and obtained a post-graduate certificate in education in Mathematics with distinction from Hughes Hall, Cambridge University in 1975 and was awarded a PhD in human response to vibration in 1980 from the Institute of Sound and Vibration Research, Southampton University.  He founded the Human Thermal Environments Laboratory at Loughborough University in 1981 and became head of the Department of Human Sciences in 1996, Dean of Science in 2003 and pro-vice chancellor for research from 2009 to 2012. He was chair of the United Kingdom Dean of Sciences from 2008 to 2010. The Human Thermal Environments Laboratory was awarded the President's Medal of the Ergonomics Society in 2001. 

In 1992 he received the Ralph G. Nevins award from the American Society of Heating, Refrigerating and Air-Conditioning Engineers (ASHRAE) for ‘significant accomplishments in the study of bioenvironmental engineering and its impact on human comfort and health.

He is fellow of the Inst. Of Ergonomics and Human Factors, the International Ergonomics Association and the Royal Society of Medicine.  He is a registered European Ergonomist and has been an elected member of the council of the Ergonomics Society.  He has been scientific advisor to the Defence Evaluation Research Agency and the Defence Clothing and Textile Agency and a member of the Defence Scientific Advisory Committee.  He has been both secretary and chair of the thermal factors committee of the International Commission on Occupational Health (ICOH), chair of the CNRS advisory committee to the Laboratoire de Physiologie et Psychologie Environmentales in Strasbourg, France, and is a life member of the Indian Ergonomics Society.  He is advisor to the World Health Organisation on heatwaves and a visiting professor to Chongqing University in China, where he has been appointed as a leading academic to the National Centre for International Research of Low Carbon and Green Buildings.

He is co-founder of the UK Indoor Environments Group and a founding member of the UK Clothing Group, the European Society for Protective Clothing, the Network for Comfort and Energy Use in Buildings and the thermal factors scientific committee of the ICOH. He is chair of ISO TC 159 SC5 ‘Ergonomics of the physical environments, chair of the British Standards Institution committee on the ergonomics of the physical environment and convener of CEN TC 122 WG11, which is the European standards committee concerned with the ergonomics of the physical environment.

Positions held
Emeritus professor of environmental ergonomics at Loughborough University.

Head of Department of Human Sciences, Loughborough University 1996 -

Dean of Science, Loughborough University 2003 -

Pro-vice Chancellor for research, Loughborough University 2009-2012

Chair, United Kingdom Dean of Sciences 2008-2010

Fellow of the Institute Of Ergonomics and Human Factors

Fellow of the International Ergonomics Association

Fellow of the Royal Society of Medicine

Chair of ISO TC 159 SC5 ‘Ergonomics of the physical environments

Chair of the British Standards Institution committee on the ergonomics of the physical environment

Chair of the CNRS advisory committee to the Laboratoire de Physiologie et Psychologie Environmentales in Stasbourg, France

Visiting professor of the International Conference on Environmental Ergonomics

Advisor to the World Health Organisation on heatwaves

Visiting Professor, Chongqing University, China

Co-editor in chief of the journal of Applied Ergonomics

Editorial board of the Journal Industrial Health

Editorial board of the Journal of Annals of Occupational Hygiene and Physiological Anthropology

Publications
Human Thermal Environments 3rd Ed. 2013, 2nd Ed. 2002, 1st Ed. 1992 Published by CRC Press

Human Thermal Comfort, 2020 Published by CRC Press

Co-author of the British Occupational Hygiene Society publication on thermal environments

Contributor to the Chartered Institute of Building Services Engineers publications on thermal comfort

Contributor to the ASHRAE Handbook: Fundamentals

Various academic research articles

Awards and recognition
Ralph G. Nevins award from the American Society of Heating, Refrigerating and Air-Conditioning Engineers (ASHRAE) for ‘significant accomplishments in the study of bioenvironmental engineering and its impact on human comfort and health’ 1992

Certificate in management from the Open University in 1993

President's Medal of the Ergonomics Society, 2001 to the Human Thermal Environments Laboratory, Loughborough University

References

1953 births
Living people
People from Northumberland